= World Volleyball Championship =

World Volleyball Championship may refer to:

- FIVB Men's Volleyball World Championship
- FIVB Women's Volleyball World Championship
